A Cul-de-lampe is
 in architecture, a weight bearing piece jutting from a wall; see Corbel
 in typographic illustration, a graphical tail piece: see Cul-de-lampe (typography)